The Japanese destroyer  was one of 21 s built for the Imperial Japanese Navy (IJN) in the late 1910s. It was decommissioned on February 1, 1940, and converted to a training ship. It was later re-converted to auxiliary ship No.2 Tomariura (第二泊浦, Dai-2 Tomariura) on December 15, 1944, and was later modified into a Shin'yō suicide motorboat mothership in 1945. It was surrendered at the end of World War II and was finally scrapped in 1947.

Design and description
The Momi class was designed with higher speed and better seakeeping than the preceding  second-class destroyers. Ashi was powered by two Brown-Curtis geared steam turbines, each driving one propeller shaft using steam provided by three Kampon water-tube boilers. Their crew consisted of 110 officers and crewmen.

The main armament of the Momi-class ships consisted of three  Type 3 guns in single mounts; one gun forward of the well deck, one between the two funnels, and the last gun atop the aft superstructure. The guns were numbered '1' to '3' from front to rear. The ships carried two above-water twin sets of  torpedo tubes; one mount was in the well deck between the forward superstructure and the bow gun and the other between the aft funnel and aft superstructure.

Construction and career

Ashi was laid down on November 15, 1920, at the Kawasaki Heavy Industries shipyard at Kobe. She was launched on September 3, 1921, and completed on October 29, 1921. It was decommissioned on February 1, 1940, and converted to a training ship. It was later re-converted to auxiliary ship No.2 Tomariura (第二泊浦, Dai-2 Tomariura) on December 15, 1944, and was later modified into a Shin'yō suicide motorboat mothership in 1945. It was surrendered at the end of World War II and was finally scrapped in 1947.

Notes

References

1921 ships
Ships built by Kawasaki Heavy Industries
Momi-class destroyers
Destroyers sunk by aircraft
Ships sunk by US aircraft
Maritime incidents in September 1942
World War II shipwrecks in the Pacific Ocean